Yuan Weimin (born July 8, 1939 in Suzhou, Jiangsu) is a Chinese sports administrator and civil servant. He was the Executive President of the Beijing Organizing Committee for the 2008 Summer Olympics.

Player career
Yuan was selected to represent the Jiangsu province in the volleyball completion for the first National Games in 1958 while studying for the Nanjing Sport Institute. In 1962, he joined the national volleyball team.

Cultural Revolution hit when he was at his peak. While he was not persecuted because of his peasant background was considered politically reliable at the time, his team members were sent home. Yuan spent much of the time studying volleyball coaching, without a team to coach. Yuan retired as a player in 1974 from the position of national team captain.

Managerial career
In 1976, Yuan was appointed the head coach of the women's national volleyball team. His task was to restore the team to the pre-Cultural Revolution-level. He did more than that, transforming a team from a 16 place finish in the 1974 FIVB Volleyball Women's World Championship to a super power, winning the 1981 World Cup, the 1982 world championship and the 1984 Olympic gold medal.

Yuan was introduced to the Volleyball Hall of Fame in 2007.

Political career
Yuan became a national hero after winning gold in the Olympics. His book My Way of Teaching was a sold out. Volleyball terms were quoted in household conversation. Yuan was promoted to vice-minister of the Sports Commission at age 36, and elected as a candidate member of the Central Committee of the Communist Party In 1985. In 2000, Yuan was promoted to the Director General of the Chinese General Administration of Sports and the chair of the Chinese Olympic Committee.

Yuan was appointed to lead the Chinese Football Association after the disastrous 1986 FIFA World Cup qualification finish. He resigned in 1989 after the national Olympic team went goalless during the 1988 Olympics, but was brought back after his replacement Nian Weisi resigned following another failure in the 1990 FIFA World Cup qualification AFC Final Round. Yuan chaired the association until 2004.

References

1939 births
Living people
Chinese volleyball coaches
Sportspeople from Suzhou
Asian Games medalists in volleyball
Volleyball players at the 1974 Asian Games
Medalists at the 1974 Asian Games
Asian Games bronze medalists for China
Nanjing Sport Institute alumni